Sevington is a historic village which has become a suburb of Ashford, Kent in England.

History
The geographically small village of Sevington is first recorded in the Domesday Book of 1086, where it appears as Seivetone. It appears as Seyueton in the Feet of Fines for 1314. The name means "the town or settlement of Sægifu", Sægifu being a woman's name.

In 1872, the village had a population of about 113.

St Mary's Church is the village's Norman parish church. It is a Grade I listed building dating from the 12th century, and has been altered at several times, first around 1200 and a second time in the 14th century,  and underwent restoration in 1877 and 1936. The church is cut off from the village by the building of the Southern Orbital road.

Geography and economy

Much of Sevington's small tract of land is covered by Ashford business park areas which are connected with Ashford by post town status and by its road network, linking them closely with Ashford.

At the start of the 21st century many changes took place in Sevington due to the building of the Orbital Business Park including the Ashford livestock market.

The village/suburb of Willesborough bounds Sevington (along its long north-west border), while the new Finberry neighbourhood is to the south in Mersham but with its own amenities.  High Speed 1, the Channel Tunnel Rail Link which adjoins the ordinary railway, passes through the parish.

Customs clearance facility

In 2019, a  tract of former farmland at Sevington was put up for sale for property development. Located close to Junction 10A of the M20 motorway, it was marketed as MOJO, an acronym for M20, Junction 10a), In July 2020, the UK Government announced that it had acquired the MOJO site to develop it as a customs clearance facility for inbound freight and a holding area for outbound freight, in preparation for the withdrawal of the United Kingdom from the European Union. The site was selected due to its proximity to the Port of Dover.  The facility has been nicknamed in the media as "the Farage Garage", in reference to the politician Nigel Farage, who has been one of the leading campaigners for Brexit. Commentators in the media have noted that the 13th-century Church of St Mary will be surrounded by the planned lorry park.

As at mid-December 2020, it is forecast to be finished by late February 2021. Although originally intended to be finished by 1 January 2021, heavy rain delayed construction; as a result, the site will temporarily only be used as a holding area, with customs checks being performed in Waterbrook Park nearby.

As of January 2022, the facility is complete but not in any significant use. The Government has repeatedly postponed introduction of import controls, with no firm plans to begin such.

References

External links

Statistical civil parish overview - map

Villages in Kent
Villages in the Borough of Ashford
Civil parishes in Ashford, Kent